Mirkovec Breznički is a village in Croatia with a population of 97 as of 2011. It is located within Breznica, Varazdin County. It is connected by the D3 highway.

References

Populated places in Varaždin County